Rufaro High School is the only boarding school of the Apostolic Faith Mission in Zimbabwe Church. It is located in the Gutu District of the Masvingo Province in Zimbabwe.

See also

 Christianity in Zimbabwe
 Education in Zimbabwe
 List of boarding schools
 List of schools in Zimbabwe

References

Boarding schools in Zimbabwe
Buildings and structures in Masvingo Province
Anglican schools in Zimbabwe
Education in Masvingo Province
Gutu District
Educational institutions established in 1987
1987 establishments in Zimbabwe